Aneurinibacillus danicus is a bacterium from the genus of Aneurinibacillus.

References

Paenibacillaceae
Bacteria described in 2004